Faniel may refer to:

  (1879-1950), Canadian painter, decorator and commercial designer of Belgian origin
  (1882-1959), Belgian architect
 Eyob Faniel (born 1992), Italian athlete